Ill Noise is a 2017 Maldivian film directed by Ismail Nihad. Produced under Theatre Mirage and Orkeyz Inc, the film stars Mohamed Munthasir in a pivotal role. The film was based on a theatre play performed by Munthasir in 2012. It was released on 27 April 2017.

Cast 
 Mohamed Munthasir
 Ahmed Alam
 Shammath Ibrahim
 Ahmed Nimal

Release 
The film was initially slated for release on 23 March 2017. Due to the alarming spread of viral and swine flu in the Maldives, the release date was postponed to 27 April 2017.

Accolades

References

External links 
 

2017 films
Maldivian thriller films
2010s English-language films